Banchangkarnchanakul Wittaya School is a district boarding school of Banchang in Rayong province, Thailand. It is located at 185 Moo 3, Ban Chang District, Rayong 21130 and operates under the Office of Rayong Educational Service Area 1, Ministry of Education. The school has students about 2,300 persons, 51 class rooms and teaching in both junior and senior high schools. The school has an area about 17 acres donated by Mr.Sutum Karnjanakul and Ms.Nuanshi Karnjanakul on 10 June 1975. In 1993, school received the Royal Award.

School History 
Banchangkarnchanakul Wittaya School is a district boarding secondary school in Banchang Rayong. 
School has an area about 17 acres. It was donated by Mr.Sutum Karnjanakul and Ms.Nuanshi Karnjanakul.

On June 10, 1975, the Ministry of Education of Thailand approved the opening initiative of the school by means of secondary school for coeducational education, which had one classroom at the beginning. 
At that time, the school building construction site was not completed, School was given permission to use one room of Banchang temple as a temporary class to study.

At the same time, the people from Aid Unit of U-Tapao Airport cooperated with the syndicate to initialize the first building of the school. After the first school's structure was completed, all teachers and students moved to study at the completed building on January 6, 1976. After that the Ministry of Education of Thailand had allocated a budget to build school buildings for the school onward to present.

School Symbols 
 School philosophy: "Wisdom, Norran " means Wisdom is a precious glass of man
 School motto: Good study, sport, notable benefits
 School Identity: Smile to share the benefits.
 School colors : Yellow and Black  "Yellow" refers to brightness and prosperity.  "Black" means firmness
 School badge: A circular pattern surrounded by school's letters which located on the Prairie of The shrine named Maria pennants land.
 School Tree: Sri Trang

References 

Schools in Thailand
Buildings and structures in Rayong province